The Gran Premio di Chiasso was an annual road bicycle race held in Chiasso, Switzerland. It was a 1.1 event on the UCI Europe Tour after 2005. The last edition was in 2007, after which it was replaced by the Gran Premio dell'Insubria-Lugano, which itself ended in 2011.

Winners

External links

Cycle races in Switzerland
Defunct cycling races in Switzerland
Recurring sporting events established in 1995
1995 establishments in Switzerland
Recurring sporting events disestablished in 2007
UCI Europe Tour races
Chiasso
2007 disestablishments in Switzerland